Albreda is a historic settlement in the Gambia on the north bank of the Gambia River, variously described as a 'trading post' or a 'slave fort'. It is located near Jufureh in the North Bank Division and an arch stands on the beach connecting the two places. As of 2008, it has an estimated population of 1,776.

History

According to Wolof oral tradition, Musa Gaye, a Wolof marabout founded it sometime between 1520 and 1681. Wolof traders called the island Draga, while the Mandinkas called it Albadar.

In 1681, a local ruler, the Niumi Mansa (the Niumi District takes its name from this Kingdom), gave the land to the French because his people depended on trade with Europeans. The French exclave was never very large (never more than one factory) but its location was inconvenient for the British, who otherwise had a monopoly on trade on the Gambia River. The British also possessed Fort James on James Island, which was less than two miles away on the opposite bank, and which fulfilled a similar function. There was constant tension and occasional skirmishes between the two powers, with Fort James changing hands between them several times, until remaining definitively under British control in 1702.

Albreda was transferred from French control to the British empire in 1857. Today it contains a slave museum which opened in 1996.

Roots
There is a family in the town who claim to be descendants of Kunta Kinte and oral historian Kebba Kanji Fofana, the man who was supposed to have told the Roots story to author Alex Haley, although the home of Kunta Kinte was the neighbouring village of Juffure.

See also
List of French possessions and colonies
Portuguese Chapel of Albreda

References

External links 
Katharina Kane. The Gambia and Senegal

Populated places in the Gambia
History of the Gambia
Gambia River
Slavery in Africa
British Empire
Former French colonies
1681 establishments in the French colonial empire
1857 disestablishments
North Bank Division